Magnus Molin (born August 21, 1979) is a male former international table tennis player from Sweden.

He won a bronze medal at the 2001 World Table Tennis Championships in the Swaythling Cup (men's team event) with Fredrik Håkansson, Peter Karlsson, Jörgen Persson and Jan-Ove Waldner for Sweden.

He also won two European Table Tennis Championships gold medals in 2000 and 2002.

See also
 List of table tennis players
 List of World Table Tennis Championships medalists

References

1979 births
Living people
Swedish male table tennis players
World Table Tennis Championships medalists